Cape Maobitou is a cape in the township of Hengchun in Pingtung County, Taiwan. It lies within Kenting National Park and forms the western boundary of South Bay. It is one of the southernmost points on Taiwan Island, sits opposite to the Cape Eluanbi in the southeast.

Name

It literally means "Cat Nose Head" but bítou is a simply a clarifying dialectical variation of bí, itself a dialectical name for a headland.

Maobitou or Maobi was formerly known as Niauphi, from the Hokkien form of the name.

Transportation
The cape is located near Taiwan's Highway 26.

See also
 Geography of Taiwan
 Kenting National Park
 Cape Eluanbi

References

Citations

Bibliography

 . 

Maobitou
Landforms of Pingtung County